Jeffrey Robert Brown (born February 16, 1968) is the dean of the Gies College of Business of the University of Illinois at Urbana-Champaign. Previously he was the William G. Karnes Professor in the Department of Finance and  the Director of the Center for Business and Public Policy. He serves as a research associate at the National Bureau of Economic Research and as Associate Director of the NBER Retirement Research Center.  Since 2009 he has served as a Trustee for TIAA, the operating company of TIAA-CREF. From October 2006 through September 2008, he served as a member of the Social Security Advisory Board. He served as a Senior Economist with the President's Council of Economic Advisers from 2001 to 2002. He earned a Ph.D. in economics from MIT (where his advisor was Jim Poterba), a Masters in Public Policy from Harvard Kennedy School, and a B.A. from Miami University.

Selected publications
Brown, J., Dimmock, S., Kang, J., Weisbenner, S. Forthcoming. How University Endowments Respond to Financial Market Shocks: Evidence and Implications. American Economic Review
Brown, J., Weisbenner, S. Forthcoming. The Distributional Effects of the Social Security Windfall Elimination Provision. Journal of Pension Economics and Finance
Brown, J., Kapteyn, A., Mitchell, O. Forthcoming. Framing and Claiming: How Information-Framing Affects Expected Social Security Claiming Behavior.. Journal of Risk and Insurance
Brown, J., Goda, G., McGarry, K. 2012. Long-Term Care Insurance Demand Limited by Beliefs about Needs, Concerns about Insurers, and Care Available from Family.. Health Affairs, 31: 1294-1302
Brown, J., Nijman, T. 2012. Options to Improve the Decumulation of Pension Wealth in the Netherlands. In The Future of Multi-Pillar Pensions. Netspar

References

1968 births
Living people
21st-century American economists
Miami University alumni
Harvard Kennedy School alumni
MIT School of Humanities, Arts, and Social Sciences alumni
Harvard University faculty
University of Illinois Urbana-Champaign faculty